The men's horizontal bar competition was one of eight events for male competitors in artistic gymnastics at the 2000 Summer Olympics in Sydney. The qualification and final rounds took place on September 16 and 25 at the Sydney Super Dome. There were 79 competitors from 28 nations; nations competing in the team event could have up to 5 gymnasts in the vault, while other nations could have up to 2 gymnasts. The event was won by Alexei Nemov of Russia, the nation's first post-Soviet victory in the horizontal bar. Nemov, a bronze medalist in 1996, was the 10th man to win multiple medals in the horizontal bar. Benjamin Varonian earned France's first medal in the event since 1976 with his silver. Lee Joo-Hyung won South Korea's first medal in the event with his bronze.

Background

This was the 20th appearance of the event, which is one of the five apparatus events held every time there were apparatus events at the Summer Olympics (no apparatus events were held in 1900, 1908, 1912, or 1920). Three of the eight finalists from 1996 returned: gold medalist (and 1992 silver medalist) Andreas Wecker of Germany, bronze medalist Alexei Nemov of Russia, and seventh-place finisher Lee Joo-Hyung of South Korea. Neither of the recent world champions (Jani Tanskanen of Finland in 1997, Jesús Carballo of Spain in 1999) competed in Sydney.

Latvia made its debut in the men's horizontal bar. The United States made its 18th appearance, most of any nation; the Americans had missed only the inaugural 1896 event and the boycotted 1980 Games.

Competition format

The 1996 gymnastics competition had introduced the "7–6–5" format, in which each team had 7 members, designated 6 for each apparatus, and had 5 count for team scores. In 2000, this was reduced across the board to a "6–5–4" format. Further, while in 1996 all 7 team members could compete on each apparatus for individual purposes, in 2000 only the 5 designated for that apparatus competed. The 2000 competition also eliminated the compulsory exercises; only voluntary exercises were done on each apparatus. The qualifying round scores were used for qualification for the team all-around, individual all-around, and apparatus finals.

The top eight gymnasts, with a limit of two per nation, advanced to the final. Non-finalists were ranked 9th through 79th based on preliminary score. The preliminary score had no effect on the final; once the eight finalists were selected, their ranking depended only on the final exercise.

Schedule

All times are Australian Eastern Standard Time (UTC+10)

Results

Qualifying

Seventy-nine gymnasts competed in the horizontal bar event during the qualification round on September 16. The eight highest scoring gymnasts advanced to the final on September 25. Each country was limited to two competitors in the final.

Final

The tie for gold was broken by execution score.

References

Official Olympic Report
www.gymnasticsresults.com

Men's horizontal bar
2000
Men's 2000
Men's events at the 2000 Summer Olympics